Myosin-13 also known as myosin, heavy chain 13 is a protein which in humans is encoded by the MYH13 gene.

Function 

MYH13 is a myosin whose expression is restricted primarily to the extrinsic eye muscles which are specialized for function in eye movement.

References

Further reading